is a Japanese fashion doll launched on July 4, 1967 by Takara, enjoying the same kind of popularity in Japan as the Barbie series does in the United States. Takara had sold over 48 million Licca-chan dolls as of 2002, and over 53 million as of 2007. Licca-chan was created by former shōjo manga artist, Miyako Maki.

Takara has provided an extensive background story for the Licca-chan doll, including an age (11), where she attends school, names and occupations for her parents, and her favorite books (Anne of Green Gables and A Little Princess). Licca-chan also likes Doraemon.

Rough Trade Records teamed up with Takara in the late 90s to release "Street Licca", who was a DJ that carried a Rough Trade record satchel, and mini, doll-sized LPs from the labels' artists.  Along with her Ursula 1000, Gants and Spearmint records, she toted a pair of pink Converse running shoes, grey "leather" pants, headphones, layered hoody and a blonde bob haircut. Street Licca was the ultimate "indie rock" doll.

In 2001, a pregnant adult version of Licca-chan was introduced which included a postcard the purchaser could send to Takara for a baby doll. The baby came with a key which allowed the doll to be returned to its standard proportions. The release of the doll happened to coincide with the birth of Aiko, the daughter of Crown Prince Naruhito and Crown Princess Masako of Japan, a factor which helped boost the sales of the new doll. Since then, other versions of Licca-chan have been introduced, including a new "Departure Licca", released just ahead of the 40th anniversary in 2007.

A Licca-chan video game was released for the Nintendo DS in Japan on November 29, 2007. This game was later released in the U.S. on October 14, 2008 as Lovely Lisa.

History 

In 1966, Takara planned to enter the dress-up doll market taking advantage of the know-how of the plastic process. The initial plan was for the company to plan a dollhouse which could be carried by children, for dressing dolls of other companies like Mattel. The size was larger than expected and the plan was reviewed not suitable for Japanese housing circumstances and children's carrying. While planning, a fashion doll, in a setting of elementary school, the height 21 cm to fit in the palm was in favor, adopting characteristics of a cartoon girl. Miyako Maki was put in charge of the illustration of the advertisement at the time of release and the advertisement was named as "supervised by Maki-sensei".

The name "Licca-chan" was decided by the general public offering on the July 1967 issue of the monthly girl manga magazine "Ribon". Subsequently, the name "Rica" became known as a name that works for both Japanese and foreigners. Two years after the launch in 1969, the dolls were accepted by the Japanese children causing Mattel (makers of the Barbie doll) to move its production base to another country, focusing less on sales in Japan. Licca-chan started exceeding Barbie sales and began to reign as the queen of Japanese dress-up dolls. Despite the popularity, Licca-chan dolls suffered a decline in sales in the 1990s due to rival dolls based on anime like Sailor Moon. In 1996, Licca-chan returned to the top sales of dress-up dolls again.

Even now, Licca-chan is highly recognized and it is even used as a synonym for other dolls from different companies. From its high recognition from the Takara era to the current Takara Tomy, Licca is positioned as a corporate identity character of the manufacturer. As of today, Japan's Licca and America's Barbie are the only two fashion dolls in the world that have lasted more than 25 years and their sales are always in competition.

Product development 
Licca chan dolls were a creation of new value for play and the objective was to provide dreams for girls. These dolls taught traditional women’ lives such as cooking, washing, cleaning, through “let’s pretend” play. To play with these dolls, many family dolls, dresses, houses and accessories were sold at the same time. In order for these dolls to be popular, the key was to always develop products from the child's perspective. It was the philosophy that Yasuhiro Kojima, a former senior managing director lived by. It still remains the founding philosophy of the product development team.

In the fictional setting, Licca-chan is born to a Japanese mother and a French father. Most customers don't know this and believe she is entirely Japanese. However, the fusion of West and Japanese elements makes the product exotic in Japan, making the sales very good.

Product specifications 
The specifications of the Licca-chan doll has changed over time. The doll is currently on its fourth generation. The first generation was launched in 1967. Licca-chan had brown curly hairs with bangs. Her charm point was the one white star in her eyes. The second generation was launched in 1972. Licca-chan's hair was more reddish brown and her bangs were parted. The stars in her eyes increased to three and she wore magnetic heels. The third generation was launched in 1982. Licca-chan's hair is a lighter brown and it is straight. Her body size is the same as the second generation and her mouth is open instead of closed. The fourth generation Licca-chan was launched in 1987. Licca-chan's hair is close to blond and her eyes were bigger. Her body grew by 1 cm making her height 22 cm.

Licca-chan, her family and friends evolved generation by generation to reflect the vogue of the time period. She depicted fashion, careers and family life of that era. Additionally, her parents were also known as an ideal married couple, ideal parents leading to an ideal family life.

Character setting 
The character setting has some variations depending on the time and is not constant. One of the key secrets behind Licca-chan's popularity was her unique profile the developers have created.

 Real name: Rika Kayama
 Birthday: May 3, 1967
 Age: 11 years old (5th grader in Shirakaba Gakuen Elementary School)
 Star Sign: Taurus
 Height: 142 cm
 Weight: 34 kg
 Personality: Cheerful but slightly impulsive 
 Future Career: Designer
 Favorite color: White and pink
 Favorite flower: Red rose
 Hobby: Singing, playing the piano, window shopping and baking

Licca's family 

 Father: Pierre Kayama (French musician, age 36, birthday: August 8) 
 Mother: Orie Kayama (Japanese designer, age 33, birthday: July 7), (opened her first fashion boutique “Jueru” in 1969)
 Older Sister: Rie (flight attendant - character product who existed from 1972 to 1974 but it is not listed on the current official website)
 Younger twin sisters: Miki and Maki Kayama (age 4, birthday: June 12, 1974)
 Younger triplets: Miku, Kako, and Gen Kayama (age 1, birthday: March 3, 1987)
 Grandpa: Albert (family name, nationality unknown; paternal grandfather), Hiroshi Kayama (Japanese, maternal grandfather)
 Grandma: Milene Miramond (French, age: 63, birthday: September 15), Yoko Kayama (Japanese, maternal grandmother, age: 56, birthday: October 10)
 Cousin: Charles
 Pets: Pee-chan (parakeet), Lemon (dog), Pudding (dog), Lime (dog)

Media
Licca-chan is a playable character in the 2003 fighting game DreamMix TV World Fighters, released by Hudson Soft for the GameCube and PlayStation 2 in Japan.
Licca-chan makes an appearance in the manga series Kiben Gakuha Yotsuya Senpai no Kaidan.

See also

Super Doll Licca-chan (anime television series)
Jenny
Asian fashion doll

References

External links
  Licca-chan page at Takara-Tomy
  Licca-chan page at Takara-Tomy
 Attack of the Anime Toys (listing many different types of Licca-chan dolls)

Products introduced in 1967
Takara Tomy franchises
Fashion dolls
Japanese fashion
Japanese popular culture